"Saint Vincent, Land so Beautiful" is the national anthem of Saint Vincent and the Grenadines. The song was first performed in 1967 and was adopted as the national anthem upon independence from the United Kingdom in 1979. The lyrics were written by Phyllis Joyce McClean Punnett and the music by Joel Bertram Miguel.

Lyrics

References

External links
Audio of Saint Vincent Land so Beautiful, with lyrics and information (archive link)

Saint Vincent and the Grenadines songs
National anthems
1967 songs
North American anthems
National symbols of Saint Vincent and the Grenadines
National anthem compositions in C major